Lake Galvė is a lake in Trakai, Lithuania. It has 21 islands, and one of them  houses Trakai Island Castle. Trakai Peninsula Castle is located on its southern shore. There are ruins of the little Orthodox church in Bažnytėlė Island.  Trakai was the capital of the Grand Duchy of Lithuania from 1321-1323 before moving to Vilnius.  The lake and most of the other lakes surrounding the castle and city have myths and legends connected to them, of which most contain a tragic love story.

References

  Trakų ežerais (Lakes of Trakai) . Trakai district municipality.

Galve